Nancy Sorrell (born 13 July 1974) is an English model, actress and television presenter from Chigwell.

Early career
Sorrell who began her career as a lap dancer, has modelled for high street brands including M&S, Next and Ann Summers and was the face of Pampers.

Television career
Sorrell appeared in the 2004 series of I'm a Celebrity... Get Me Out of Here!, and was later joined in the jungle by her husband, comedian Vic Reeves. Sorrell was the first to be voted out of the jungle. In June of that year, she performed live with rock guitarist Jeff Beck at the Royal Albert Hall, for a rendition of the song, "Cry Me a River". She also collaborated with Beck the previous year for his solo album, Jeff, providing vocals on several tracks. Sorrell appeared as Greta in Love Actually. She has also presented Trust Me – I'm a Holiday Rep on Channel 5 with Toby Anstis, has appeared on a special celebrity edition of Channel 4's Come Dine with Me with Caprice, Nicky Clarke and Jimmy Osmond and was a guest on the BBC's Hole in the Wall and Celebrity Antiques Road Trip with her husband.

Personal life
Sorrell married Vic Reeves in January 2003, and the couple have twin girls, born in May 2006. She is also the stepmother to his two children from a previous marriage. The family live in Charing, near Ashford, Kent.

References

External links

1974 births
English female models
English television presenters
Living people
People from Chigwell
I'm a Celebrity...Get Me Out of Here! (British TV series) participants
People from Charing